Callidalena is a genus of funnel weavers first described by J. Maya-Morales and M. L. Jiménez in 2017.  it contains only two species.

References

External links

Agelenidae
Araneomorphae genera